Hegins (pronounced Higgins) is a census-designated place located in Hegins Township, Schuylkill County in the state of Pennsylvania, United States.  The community is located near the community of Valley View at the intersection of Pennsylvania Routes 25 and 125 and is  approximately 50 miles northeast of Harrisburg.  As of the 2018 the population was 850 .

Demographics

Gallery

References

Census-designated places in Schuylkill County, Pennsylvania
Census-designated places in Pennsylvania